The western false smooth snake or Iberian false smooth snake (Macroprotodon brevis) is a species of snake in the family Colubridae.

Feeding habits 
The species feeds exclusively on vertebrates, mainly reptiles, and mostly long-bodied prey which are burrowers or live under rocks.

Some aspects of its morphology and feeding habits suggest that it is not nocturnal, but rather lives under rocks.

Geographic range
M. brevis is found on the Iberian Peninsula and Morocco.

Habitat
The natural habitats of M. brevis include evergreen temperate forests and Mediterranean-style scrubland.

Conservation status
M. brevis is threatened by habitat loss, largely the result of agriculture, and faces some threat from the wild boar.

References

Further reading
Günther A (1862). "On new Species of Snakes in the Collection of the British Museum". Ann. Mag. Nat. Hist., Third Series 9: 52–59. (Coronella brevis, new species, p. 58).

Macroprotodon
Reptiles described in 1862
Taxa named by Albert Günther
Taxonomy articles created by Polbot
Reptiles of North Africa